Vietnam claims an exclusive economic zone (EEZ) of  with  from its shores.

This figure does not include the EEZ areas of the Paracel Islands and the Spratly Islands. Vietnam has disputes mainly with the People's Republic of China due to the nine-dash line.

It includes much of the western area of the South China Sea and parts of the southern area bordering Malaysia and Brunei's EEZs. Vietnam has dozens of islands.

Disputes 

Vietnam's disputes are mainly with the People's Republic of China. Vietnam rejects China's nine-dash line which extends much further than China's  from its shores. The nine-dash line cuts straight through Vietnam's Exclusive Economic Zone in the South China Sea and would reduce Vietnam's EEZ by 3/4th. This line also cuts the EEZ of the Philippines and Malaysia in half. Brunei would lose 90% of its EEZ. According to former Philippine President Benigno Aquino III, "China's nine-dash line territorial claim over the entire South China Sea is against international laws, particularly the United Nations Convention of the Laws of the Sea (UNCLOS)". Vietnam also rejected the Chinese claim, citing that it is baseless and against the UNCLOS.

In the spring of 2014, China and Vietnam clashed over China's Haiyang Shiyou oil rig in Vietnam's EEZ. The incident left seventeen Vietnamese injured and damaged both China's and Vietnam's ships.

Paracel and Spratly Islands 
The Paracel Islands and the Spratly Islands were recognized as part of Vietnam in 1954. The Geneva Accords of 1954, which ended the First Indochina War, gave South Vietnam control of the Vietnamese territories south of the 17th Parallel, which included the islands in the Paracels and Spratlys, at least according to Vietnam interpretations.

In 1974, during the Vietnam War, the PRC used military force in the Paracel Islands and took Yagong Island and the Crescent group of reefs from South Vietnam. Since the 1990s China still occupies and controls all of the Paracel Islands. The PRC controls all of the features in the Paracels.

Vietnam controls 29 features of the Spratly Islands. However, since 2013 China has been constructing artificial islands on reefs and military bases which changed the balance of power in favour of the PRC in the South China Sea.

See also 
 Exclusive economic zone of Indonesia
 Exclusive economic zone of Malaysia
 Exclusive economic zone of the Philippines
 Exclusive economic zone of Thailand

Notes

References 

Vietnam
Borders of Vietnam
Economy of Vietnam
China–Vietnam relations